The Mazda RX-500 is a mid-engine concept car developed by Japanese automobile manufacturer Mazda and first shown to the public at the 17th 1970 Tokyo Motor Show. It is a two-door coupé, accessed by forward-swinging butterfly-wing doors. The car received its name due to Mazda celebrating their 50th birthday.

The RX-500 was promoted as a mobile test bed for road safety, including multi-coloured lights at the rear which indicated whether the car was speeding up, braking or cruising. Braking was shown by red lights, cruising by amber lights and speeding up by green lights.

The car weighs  due to the use of light weight plastic in its construction, and is powered by a 982 cc X 2 double-rotor (10A) Wankel engine that was mounted forward of the rear axle. The engine is accessed via gull-wing doors.
 
It is often implied that at least three cars were made but the claim is not true. The sole example was originally painted orange at its first public appearance and lacked headlamps. It was later repainted silver and was stored in the Mazda factory. The car was restored for the 2009 Tokyo Motor Show and is now on display at Hiroshima City Transportation Museum. The car was also on display at the Goodwood Festival of Speed in the UK in 2014.

References

External links

RX-500
Cars powered by Wankel engines
Cars introduced in 1970
Rear-engined vehicles
Rear-wheel-drive vehicles